The Nymph’s Reply to the Shepherd (1600), by Walter Raleigh, is a poem that responds to and parodies the poem “The Passionate Shepherd to His Love” (1599), by Christopher Marlowe. The nymph's reply to the shepherd's invitation is a point-by-point rejection of the shepherd's courtship for a life of pastoral idyll. Stylistically, the poems by Marlowe and Raleigh are pastoral poetry written in six quatrains that employ a clerihew rhyme-scheme of AABB.

The poem
The Nymph’s Reply to the Shepherd (1600)

by Walter Raleigh (1552 – 1618)
If all the world and love were young,
And truth in every shepherd's tongue,
These pretty pleasures might me move
To live with thee and be thy love.

Time drives the flocks from field to fold
When Rivers rage and Rocks grow cold,
And Philomel becometh dumb;
The rest complains of cares to come.

The flowers do fade, and wanton fields
To wayward winter reckoning yields;
A honey tongue, a heart of gall,
Is fancy's spring, but sorrow's fall.

Thy gowns, thy shoes, thy beds of roses,
Thy cap, thy kirtle, and thy posies
Soon break, soon wither, soon forgotten:
In folly ripe, in reason rotten.

Thy belt of straw and Ivy buds,
Thy coral clasps and amber studs,
All these in me no means can move
To come to thee and be thy love.

But could youth last and love still breed,
Had joys no date nor age no need,
Then these delights my mind might move
To live with thee and be thy love.

Influence
In the film The Private Lives of Elizabeth and Essex (1939), the poems are sung as a duet; Mistress Margaret Radcliffe sings Marlowe's proposition, “The Passionate Shepherd to His Love”, and Lady Penelope Gray sings Raleigh's rebuttal, “The Nymph’s Reply to the Shepherd”, which performance angers Elizabeth I of England as allusion to her doomed love for Robert Devereux, 2nd Earl of Essex.

In the 20th century, with the poem Raleigh was Right (0000) the poet William Carlos Williams sided against Christopher Marlowe.

References

External links

 

British poems
1596 poems
Works by Walter Raleigh
Christopher Marlowe